Saidpur is a constituency of the Uttar Pradesh Legislative Assembly covering the city of Saidpur in the Ghazipur district of Uttar Pradesh, India.

Saidpur is one of five assembly constituencies in the Ghazipur Lok Sabha constituency. Since 2008, this assembly constituency is numbered 374 amongst 403 constituencies.

Members of the Legislative Assembly

Election results

2022

2017
Samajwadi Party candidate Subhash Pasi won in 2017 Uttar Pradesh Legislative Elections  defeating Bharatiya Janta Party candidate Vidyasagar Sonkar by a margin of 8,710 votes.

References

External links
 

Assembly constituencies of Uttar Pradesh
Politics of Ghazipur district